is a fighting video game in Capcom's Street Fighter series, originally released as a coin-operated arcade game in 1997. The game's name as it appears on the cabinet is Three: A New Generation of Street Fighters. Street Fighter III was produced for the CD-ROM-based CP System III hardware, which allowed for more elaborate 2D graphics than the CPS II-based Street Fighter Alpha games (the previous incarnation of the Street Fighter series), while revamping many of the play mechanics. The game, which was designed as a direct sequel to Street Fighter II, initially discarded every previous character except for Ryu and Ken (hence the "New Generation" subtitle), introducing an all-new roster led by Alex. Likewise, a new antagonist named Gill took over M. Bisons role from the previous games as the new boss character.

Street Fighter III was followed by two updates: Street Fighter III: 2nd Impact in 1997 and Street Fighter III: 3rd Strike in 1999. A single home version of the game was released for the Dreamcast in a two-in-one compilation titled Street Fighter III: Double Impact, which also includes 2nd Impact.

Gameplay

Like its predecessors, Street Fighter III is a one-on-one fighting game, in which two fighters use a variety of attacks and special moves to knock out their opponent. The gameplay of the original Street Fighter III has several new abilities and features introduced. Some abilities are also taken from other Capcom fighting games, such as players being able to dash or retreat like in the Darkstalkers series, as well as performing super jumps and quick stands after falling from an attack like in X-Men: Children of the Atom. The game also introduced leap attacks, which are small jumping attacks used against crouching opponents. As well, the player cannot perform aerial guards like in the Street Fighter Alpha series, which are replaced by parrying ("blocking" in the Japanese version).

The 1994 fighting game Samurai Shodown II is often credited with the first parry system. The main new feature is the ability to parry an opponent's attack, by deflecting any incoming attack without receiving damage. At the exact moment an opponent's attack is about to hit his or her character, the player can move the controller toward or down to parry the attack without receiving damage, leaving the opponent vulnerable for a counterattack. Additionally, this allows the player to defend against Special Moves and even Super Arts without sustaining the normal minor damage that blocking normally would incur. However, parrying requires precise timing.

The other new feature introduced in Street Fighter III is Super Arts. This is a powerful special move similar to a Super Combo in Super Turbo and the Alpha games. After selecting a character, the player will be prompted to select from one of three character-specific Super Arts to use in battle. Like the Super Combo gauge in previous games, the player has a Super Art gauge which will fill up as the player performs regular and special moves against an opponent. The player can only perform a Super Art once the gauge is filled. Depending on the Super Art chosen by the player, the length of the Super Art gauge will vary, as well as the amount of filled Super Art gauges the player can stock up. The players can now cancel a special move into a Super Art, a technique borrowed from Street Fighter EX.

Among the elaborated sprites include multiple hit stun sprites, including a new "turned-around state," in which a character is turned around (his or her back faces the opponent) after being hit. Only certain attacks can put characters in a turned-around state, and grabs and throws can now be comboed, as it typically takes longer for an attacked character to recover from this new type of hit stun.

Characters
 Ryu - As usual, Ryu seeks to better his skills and find worthy opponents. Voiced by Wataru Takagi in New Generation and 2nd Impact, and by Toru Okawa in 3rd Strike.
 Ken - As the current U.S. martial arts champion, Ken seeks to test his strength against his old friend and rival Ryu, once again. Voiced by Koji Tobe in New Generation and 2nd Impact, and Yuji Kishi in 3rd Strike.
 Alex - The lead character of the Street Fighter III series. He fights with close-range grappling techniques and powerful punches. His initial goal is to avenge the defeat of his friend Tom at the hands of Gill. He later gets defeated by Ryu in Third Strike. Voiced by Michael Sommers in New Generation and 2nd Impact, and Patrick Gallagan in 3rd Strike.
 Dudley - A gentleman British boxer who seeks to recover his late father's antique Jaguar convertible from Gill. Voiced by Bruce Robertson in New Generation and 2nd Impact, and by Francis Diakowsky in 3rd Strike.
 Elena - An African princess from Kenya who uses the fighting style of capoeira. She seeks to make new friends. All of her attacks use her legs or feet, even the punch button attacks and throws. Voiced by Kaoru Fujino in New Generation and 2nd Impact, and Mie Midori in 3rd Strike.
 Ibuki - An aspiring female ninja who is sent to retrieve the G File from Gill's organization. Voiced by Yuri Amano in all three games in the series.
 Necro - A Russian man who was kidnapped and experimented on by Gill's organization. He seeks revenge only to get trapped and barely escape later on. Voiced by Michael X. Sommers in New Generation and 2nd Impact, and by Lawrence Bayne in 3rd Strike.
 Oro - A seclusive hermit who seeks a fighter worthy to inherit his fighting style. He binds one arm while fighting, to keep from accidentally killing his opponent (except when performing specific special techniques). Voiced by Kan Tokumaru in New Generation and 2nd Impact, and by Takashi Matsuyama in 3rd Strike.
 Sean - A young Japanese-Brazilian fighter who becomes Ken's self-appointed apprentice. Voice by Isshin Chiba in New Generation and 2nd Impact, and Mitsuo Iwata in 3rd Strike.
 Yun and Yang -  Twin kung fu experts from Hong Kong who are guardians of their hometown. While the two brothers are head-swaps, their move sets are identical and they share the same slot in the player select screen, but Yang was given a separate moveset and slot in 2nd Impact. Yun was voiced by Koji Tobe in New Generation and 2nd Impact, and by Kentaro Ito in 3rd Strike. Yang was voiced by Wataru Takagi in New Generation and 2nd Impact, and by Masakazu Suzuki in 3rd Strike.
 Gill - The leader of a secret organization which seeks to turn the Earth into a utopia.  He can manipulate fire and ice. He is the final opponent for all the characters in New Generation and 3rd Strike, and for most of the characters in 2nd Impact. Gill is only playable in the console versions of the series. Voiced by Bruce Robertson in New Generation and 2nd Impact, and Lawrence Bayne in 3rd Strike.

Development
Capcom announced that Street Fighter III was in development during a March 27, 1996 meeting in Tokyo. They later stated that development took more than two years.

The game was first unveiled at the September 1996 Japan Amusement Machine and Marketing Association show, in the form of a few minutes of footage incorporated into Capcom's PR demo tape. In an interview shortly before this show, Capcom senior planner Shinji Mikami stated that it would be impossible to convert Street Fighter III to any of the home consoles then on the market. This prompted rumors that it would be ported to the then-upcoming Panasonic M2. In January 1997, IGN witnessed a demonstration of the game in development on Nintendo 64 and 64DD, so IGN and its anonymous insider speculated that the game might join the launch of the upcoming 64DD peripheral in Japan, which was scheduled for late 1997. Capcom referred to the Nintendo 64 release as "just a rumor", and Nintendo would coincidentally delay the launch of the 64DD peripheral until December 1999 anyway. Amending Mikami's earlier statement, in late 1997 Capcom said it might be possible to port Street Fighter III to the Sega Saturn if one of the console's RAM expansion cartridges were used.

Because this and the next two Street Fighter III games run on the CPS III engine, more elaborate 2D sprites were created. Each character is made up from approximately 700–1200 individually drawn frames of animation, with the game running at 60 frames per second.

General producer Noritaka Funamizu explained the controversial decision to keep the series in 2D: "We feel that 3D is not really suitable for the head-to-head fighting ... and, to be frank, Capcom doesn't really have the techniques to display high quality graphics in 3D."

Release
In 1999, Capcom released Street Fighter III: Double Impact (Street Fighter III: W Impact in Japan) for the Dreamcast, a compilation containing the original game and 2nd Impact. The compilation features an Arcade, Versus, Training, and Option Mode for both games, as well as a "Parry Attack Mode" in 2nd Impact, where the player can test parrying skills in the game's bonus round. This compilation also allows players to use Gill (in both games) and Shin Akuma (in 2nd Impact only), who are exclusively computer-controlled characters in the arcade version.

The soundtrack to the first game in the series was released on CD by First Smile Entertainment in 1997, and the 3rd Strike original soundtrack was released by Mars Colony Music in 2000 with an arranged version afterward. The soundtrack to 3rd Strike features three songs and announcer tracks by Canadian rapper Infinite. The themes for the games are predominantly drum and bass, with some jazz, hip-hop, house and techno elements. Yuki Iwai worked on the soundtracks for New Generation and 2nd Impact, and Hideki Okugawa worked on all three games.

New Generation was re-released in 2018 as part of the Street Fighter 30th Anniversary Collection for the PlayStation 4, Xbox One, PC, and Nintendo Switch.

Reception

In Japan, Game Machine listed Street Fighter III on their April 1, 1997 issue as being the most successful arcade game of the month. However, the game struggled to break even in Japan, with a high budget of 1 billion yen ($8 million), while only selling 1,000 cabinets. Worldwide arcade sales estimates range from between 1,000 and 10,000 units sold.

Next Generation reviewed the arcade version of the game, rating it four stars out of five, and stated that "The great mystery is why Capcom called this SFIII instead of leaving that honor for a more powerful and revolutionary 3D title. Gameplay in the SF series reached the ceiling of 2D possibilities a while ago, and as good as this game admittedly is, besides the stunning graphics there's little to distinguish it from the 11 games before." GamePro similarly remarked that while the graphics are outstanding and the controls are flawless, the game lacks the innovation and series evolution that players expected it to deliver. They also said the new characters are a mix, with some of them seeming like they would be more appropriate for the Darkstalkers series, and concluded that the game "makes you look forward to the next SF installment rather than getting you excited about playing this one repeatedly".

Famitsu magazine scored Street Fighter III: Double Impact, the Dreamcast version of the game, 31 out of 40.

Jim Preston reviewed the Dreamcast version of the game for Next Generation, rating it three stars out of five, and stated that "It's a no-frills port of the arcade game that is great at a party but pointless for single players."

References

External links
Official website of Street Fighter III W Impact for the Dreamcast 

1997 video games
Fighting games
2D fighting games
Arcade video games
Cancelled Panasonic M2 games
CP System III games
Dreamcast games
Rutubo Games games
Street Fighter games
Video games developed in Japan
Video game sequels
Video games set in New York City
Video games set in Japan
Video games set in England
Video games set in Kenya
Video games set in Moscow
Video games set in Brazil
Video games set in Hong Kong
Video games with alternate endings
Video games with alternative versions
Virgin Interactive games
Works about the Illuminati
Multiplayer and single-player video games